Ophyx bethunei is a moth of the family Erebidae first described by Jeremy Daniel Holloway in 1984. It is found on New Guinea. The habitat consists of mountainous areas.

References

Ophyx
Moths described in 1984